Gabriel-Alphonse Desjardins (November 5, 1854 – October 31, 1920), born in Lévis, Quebec, was the co-founder of the Caisses Populaires Desjardins (today Desjardins Group), a forerunner of North American credit unions and community banks. For his contribution to the advancement of agriculture in the province of Quebec, he was posthumously inducted to the Agricultural Hall of Fame of Quebec in 1994.

Early life 
Gabriel-Alphonse Desjardins was a journalist at L'écho and Le Canadien until 1879. He was publisher of Débats de la législature du Québec from 1879 to 1890, and French-language parliamentary stenographer at the House of Commons of Canada from 1892 to 1917.

Start of caisses populaires 

In 1897 Desjardins became increasingly concerned with the problem of usury and undertook three years of careful research and correspondence with the founders of cooperative savings and credit movements in Europe. On December 6, 1900, Desjardins and his wife, Dorimène Roy Desjardins, co-founded the first Caisse d'épargne Desjardins in Lévis and opened for business the following month.  Later renamed Caisses populaires Desjardins (and today Desjardins Group), the organization was a forerunner of current North American credit unions.

Caisse populaire is a synthesis of four popular savings and credit systems established in Germany, Italy and France: the caisse d'épargne, the Schulze-Delitzsch bank, the Raiffeisen credit co-operative and the Luzzatti popular bank. Desjardins stayed in close contact with many of the founders of the European co-operative movement throughout his life.

From 1900 to 1906, Desjardins founded just three other caisses populaires: Lauzon (1902), Hull (1903), and Saint-Malo, Québec (1905).  After failing to get a federal law passed in Ottawa that would provide a Canadian-wide framework for more such organizations, Desjardins turned his efforts, with the collaboration of journalists and priests, to founding more caisses. During the 1907-1914 period, Desjardins personally founded 146 caisses.

At the time of his death in 1920, there were 187 caisses populaires in Québec (30,000 members and total assets of nearly $6 million), 24 in Ontario and 9 in the United States.

Alphonse and Dorimène Desjardins' home, where the first caisse populaire was launched, is now a center dedicated to his memory and has been visited by over 178,000 people from 115 countries since its opening in 1982.

See also 
Dorimène Roy Desjardins
Desjardins Group
History of credit unions

External links
Biography at the Dictionary of Canadian Biography Online
 Welcome to... / Bienvenue à... at collections.ic.gc.ca
 About Desjardins – Historical context at www.desjardins.com
 About Desjardins - 1900 - 1920: Start up at www.desjardins.com

References 

Pre-Confederation Canadian businesspeople
1854 births
1920 deaths
Canadian cooperative organizers
People from Lévis, Quebec
Persons of National Historic Significance (Canada)
Desjardins Group
Burials at Notre Dame des Neiges Cemetery